The North Anna River is a principal tributary of the Pamunkey River, about  long, in central Virginia in the United States.  Via the Pamunkey and York rivers, it is part of the watershed of Chesapeake Bay.  The river was the site of the Battle of North Anna during the American Civil War.

According to the Geographic Names Information System, the river has also been known as "Northa-Anna" and as the main stem of the Pamunkey River.

Course
The North Anna River is formed by a confluence of smaller streams in western Orange County and flows generally southeastwardly. The river's course is used to define all or portions of the southern boundaries of Orange, Spotsylvania and Caroline counties; and the northern boundaries of Louisa and Hanover counties.

The North Anna Dam on the common boundary of Louisa and Spotsylvania counties causes the river to form Lake Anna, which was created to provide water for the adjacent North Anna Nuclear Generating Station.

Near its mouth the North Anna River collects the Little River.  Other tributaries of the North Anna include Pamunkey Creek and Contrary Creek.

See also
List of Virginia rivers

References

Columbia Gazetter of North America entry
DeLorme (2005).  Virginia Atlas & Gazetteer.  Yarmouth, Maine: DeLorme.  .

Rivers of Virginia
Tributaries of the York River (Virginia)
Rivers of Caroline County, Virginia
Rivers of Hanover County, Virginia
Rivers of Louisa County, Virginia
Rivers of Orange County, Virginia
Rivers of Spotsylvania County, Virginia
Greater Richmond Region